Joanna Bartosz (born 14 February 1954) is a Polish gymnast. She competed at the 1972 Summer Olympics.

References

External links
 

1954 births
Living people
Polish female artistic gymnasts
Olympic gymnasts of Poland
Gymnasts at the 1972 Summer Olympics
Sportspeople from Olsztyn
20th-century Polish women